Blue Greens & Beans is an album by saxophonist David "Fathead" Newman recorded in Holland in 1990 and released on the Timeless label.

Track listing 
 "Blue Greens and Beans" (Mal Waldron) – 7:43
 "Montana Banana" (David "Fathead" Newman) – 8:29
 "I've Grown Accustomed to Her Face" (Frederick Loewe, Alan Jay Lerner) – 5:01	
 "A Night in Tunisia" (Dizzy Gillespie, Frank Paparelli) – 10:43
 "Good Bait" (Tadd Dameron, Count Basie) – 8:38	
 "Skylark" (Hoagy Carmichael, Johnny Mercer) – 5:44
 "Wide Open Spaces" (Babs Gonzales) – 8:26

Personnel 
David "Fathead" Newman – tenor saxophone, flute (tracks 1, 2 & 4-7)
Marchel Ivery – tenor saxophone (tracks 1-5 & 7)
Rein de Graaff – piano
Koos Serierse – bass 
Eric Ineke – drums

References 

David "Fathead" Newman albums
1991 albums
Timeless Records albums